Jalilabad (also Romanized as Jalīlābād; also known as Khalīlābād and Shahrak-e Jalīlābād) is a village in Jalilabad Rural District of Jalilabad District of Pishva County, Tehran province, Iran. At the 2006 National Census, its population was 5,520 in 1,322 households, when it was in the former Pishva District of Varamin County. The following census in 2011 counted 5,379 people in 1,429 households, by which time the district had been separated from the county and Pishva County established. The latest census in 2016 showed a population of 5,216 people in 1,492 households; it was the largest village in its rural district.

References 

Pishva County

Populated places in Tehran Province

Populated places in Pishva County